Intern is a 2000 satirical comedy film directed by Michael Lange about the shallow world of fashion magazines. It stars Dominique Swain, Joan Rivers, Peggy Lipton, Paulina Porizkova and Kathy Griffin. The film features multiple cameo appearances including Tommy Hilfiger, Kenneth Cole, Diane von Fürstenberg, Kevyn Aucoin, André Leon Talley, Samia Shoaib, and Gwyneth Paltrow. 

Caroline Doyle and Jill Kargman, both of whom had stints in fashion journalism at Mademoiselle, Harper's Bazaar, and Interview magazines, wrote the screenplay. The film had its world premiere at the Sundance Film Festival on January 21, 2000.

Plot
Jocelyn Bennett is an intern at the fictional New York City magazine, Skirt. Horribly mistreated, overworked, and underpaid, Jocelyn lives for Skirt, especially the photo spreads. A spy begins to hand over Skirts spreads and story ideas to its rival glossy, Vogue. Skirt magazine finds itself in a bind and some people begin speculating who the infiltrator (everyone refers to the spy as a "yuri") might be. After some fingers begin to point at Jocelyn, she seeks to apprehend the spy and clear her name. Along the way, she meets Paul Rochester, the British deputy art director at Skirt, with whom she has much in common. When she finds herself falling in love, one thing stands in her way: Paul's supermodel girlfriend, Resin. Jocelyn continues to search for the spy but several obstacles stand in her way, including Art Director Sebastian Niedarfarb, who believes she is the spy and consistently puts Jocelyn down. However, as she begins to climb the ranks, she begins to stand out to the editors who realize her potential, though they quickly forget it. To make Paul jealous, she starts dating a photo shoot tech named Alex, though the relationship doesn't last. Jocelyn later learns that Resin is only dating Paul because he is related to Prince Charles. Soon after, the spy is apprehended. For her work, Jocelyn is made an assistant, on staff, and finally gets better treatment from her colleagues. During a party thrown by Skirt, Resin dumps Paul for another model, and Paul and Jocelyn get engaged.Two years later, the happy couple are shown on a PBS tour done by the newest intern at Skirt. Jocelyn has been made the senior photo editor at the magazine and Paul accomplished his dream of becoming a famous artist. They are set to be married in a few months.

Cast
 Dominique Swain as Jocelyn Bennett
 Ben Pullen as Paul Rochester
 Leilani Bishop as Resin
 Peggy Lipton as Roxanne Rochet
 Paulina Porizkova as Chi Chi Chemise
 Billy Porter as Sebastian Niederfarb
 Kathy Griffin as Cornelia Crisp
 Anna Levine as Antoinette De la Paix
 Joan Rivers as Dolly Bellows
 Tommy Hilfiger as himself
 André Leon Talley as himself
 Diane von Fürstenberg as herself
 Kevyn Aucoin as himself
 Kenneth Cole as himself
 Gwyneth Paltrow as herself

Reception
On Rotten Tomatoes, the film holds an approval rating of 38% based on reviews from 8 critics, with an average rating of 5.7/10.

While some critics praised the dialogue and writing of the film and said it contained a “few entertaining moments", others said it was "a disappointingly flat and familiar look at the glamour industry." Stephen Holden of The New York Times said, "The biggest mystery about Intern is how a film about people who are obsessed with appearances could wind up looking so hopelessly drab and tacky." Stephen MacMillan Moser of The Austin Chronicle said, "Intern isn't a particularly deep movie, but, to paraphrase Karl Lagerfeld, fashion is not the same thing as feeding the hungry and curing the ill."

References

External links
 
 

2000 films
2000 comedy films
2000 in fashion
2000 independent films
2000s American films
2000s English-language films
2000s satirical films
American comedy films
American satirical films
Films about fashion in the United States
Films directed by Michael Lange
Films set in New York City
Workplace comedy films
Works about fashion magazine publishing